Acheta is a genus of crickets. It most notably contains the house cricket (Acheta domesticus). According to Direction 46 issued by the ICZN in 1956, this generic name is masculine in gender.

Species
Acheta angustiusculus
Acheta arabicus
Acheta brevipennis
Acheta chudeaui
Acheta confalonierii
Acheta domesticus Linnaeus, 1758
Acheta gossypii
Acheta hispanicus
Acheta latiusculus
Acheta meridionalis
Acheta pachycephalus
Acheta rufopictus
Acheta svatoshi
Acheta turcomanus
Acheta turcomanoides

References

Acheta at Encyclopedia of Life

Gryllinae
Orthoptera genera
Taxa named by Carl Linnaeus